Willie Ross may refer to:

 Willie Ross, Baron Ross of Marnock (1911–1988), Scottish Labour Party politician, Secretary of State for Scotland 1964–1970 1974–1976
 Willie Ross (footballer, born 1919) (1919–1990), Scottish football player
 Willie Ross (football manager) (died 1985), Scottish football player and manager (Derry City)
 William Ross (Unionist politician) (born 1936), former Ulster Unionist MP for Londonderry 1974–1983 and East Londonderry 1983–2001
 Willie Ross (piper) (1878–1966), Scottish bagpipe player
 Willie Ross (American football) (born 1941), American football player

See also
William Ross (disambiguation)